Nim Dorjee Tamang (born 30 October 1995) is an Indian professional footballer who plays as a defender for Indian Super League club Hyderabad.

Career
Born in Melli, Sikkim, Tamang started playing football with the Namchi Sports Hostel before joining the Air Force Academy from 2009 to 2010. After making appearances with the India under-16 side, Tamang joined Shillong Lajong's youth team.

Tamang was given a place in Shillong Lajong's first-team squad for the 2014–15 season. He made his professional debut in the Federation Cup against Pune on 29 December 2014. He started the match as Shillong Lajong were defeated 1–3. A month later, on 18 January 2015, Tamang made his competitive league debut in the I-League against Royal Wahingdoh. He started the match but couldn't prevent Shillong Lajong from losing 1–2.

On 12 April 2015, Tamang scored his first competitive goal for Shillong Lajong in a 1–1 draw against Royal Wahingdoh in the I-League.

On 10 July 2015, Tamang was up for selection in the 2015 Indian Super League draft but was ultimately not selected and thus he stayed with Shillong Lajong. Prior to the 2016–17 season, Tamang was named Shillong Lajong captain.

Pune City
On 23 July 2017, Tamang was selected in the 2017–18 ISL Players Draft in the 6th round by Pune City. He would end up missing the 2017–18 season due to injuries.

Tamang made his return to football on 3 October 2018 in Pune City's opening match against Delhi Dynamos. He started at right-back as Pune City drew the match 1–1.

NorthEast United
On 2 August 2019, Tamang joined fellow Indian Super League side NorthEast United. He made his debut for the club on 27 November 2019 against Mumbai City. He started at center-back as NorthEast United drew the match 2–2.

Hyderabad
On 30 July 2021, Tamang joined Hyderabad on a three-year deal.

International
Tamang has played for India at both the under-17 and under-20 levels. He also played for India's under-19 during the 2014 AFC U-19 Championship qualifiers.

Career statistics

References

External links 
 Indian Super League Profile

1995 births
Living people
People from Namchi district
Footballers from Sikkim
Indian Gorkhas
Indian footballers
Shillong Lajong FC players
FC Pune City players
NorthEast United FC players
Association football defenders
I-League players
Indian Super League players
India youth international footballers
Hyderabad FC players
Tamang people